Erbessa semimarginata is a moth of the family Notodontidae first described by Paul Dognin in 1902. It is found from Panama south to Peru and Colombia.

References

Moths described in 1902
Notodontidae of South America